The 2014 Southeastern Conference baseball tournament was held from May 20 through 25 at Hoover Metropolitan Stadium in Hoover, Alabama.  The annual tournament determines the tournament champion of the Division I Southeastern Conference in college baseball.   claimed their record 11th tournament championship and earned the conference's automatic bid to the 2014 NCAA Division I baseball tournament.

The tournament has been held every year since 1977, with LSU claiming eleven championships, the most of any school.  Original members Georgia and Kentucky along with 1992 addition Arkansas and 2012 additions Texas A&M and Missouri have never won the tournament.  This is the seventeenth consecutive year and nineteenth overall that the event has been held at Hoover Metropolitan Stadium, known from 2007 through 2012 as Regions Park.

The SEC implemented experimental instant replay rules at the 2014 tournament.  The rules allowed review of fair/foul, home run, and spectator interference calls.

Format and seeding
The regular season division winners claimed the top two seeds and the next ten teams by conference winning percentage, regardless of division, claimed the remaining berths in the tournament.  The bottom eight teams played a single-elimination opening round, followed by a double-elimination format until the semifinals, when the format reverted to single elimination through the championship game. This was the second year of this format.

Bracket

All-Tournament Team
The following players were named to the All-Tournament Team.

Bold is MVP.

References

Tournament
Southeastern Conference Baseball Tournament
Southeastern Conference baseball tournament
Southeastern Conference baseball tournament
College sports tournaments in Alabama
Baseball competitions in Hoover, Alabama